Arthur Francis Merewether (July 7, 1902 – February 2, 1997), nicknamed "Merry", was an American professional baseball player. He played in Major League Baseball for the Pittsburgh Pirates.

A native of East Providence, Rhode Island, Merewether played college baseball at Brown University, where he was a second baseman. He was signed out of college by the Pittsburgh Pirates and after spending time in Pittsburgh's minor league system, he appeared in one game as a pinch hitter for the big league club in 1922. 

Following his stint with the Pirates, Merewether enrolled in a graduate program at Massachusetts Institute of Technology. At MIT, he once again played collegiate baseball, was the captain of the club, and received his masters degree in chemistry in 1925. In the summer of 1925, Merewether played second base for the Osterville town team in what is now the Cape Cod Baseball League, helping lead the team to the league title. He died in Bayside, New York in 1997 at age 94.

References

External links

1902 births
1997 deaths
Pittsburgh Pirates players
Brown Bears baseball players
MIT Engineers baseball players
Cape Cod Baseball League players (pre-modern era)
Hyannis Harbor Hawks players
Baseball players from Rhode Island
People from East Providence, Rhode Island